Brenda Noemi Viramontes Ávalos (born 24 April 1995), known as Brenda Viramontes, is a Mexican professional football midfielder. 
In 2017, she helped elevate Chivas to win the first professional women's soccer championship in the country in front of a record-setting 32,466 spectators.

Playing career

Guadalajara, 2017 
Viramontes began playing for Guadalajara during the inaugural season of Liga MX Femenil. She scored 7 goals in 14 games.

Honours

Club
Guadalajara
Liga MX Femenil: Apertura 2017

Notes

References

External links
 
 Brenda Viramontes at C.D. Guadalajara Femenil 

1995 births
Living people
Mexican women's footballers
Footballers from Jalisco
Liga MX Femenil players
C.D. Guadalajara (women) footballers
Women's association football forwards
Mexican footballers